Steneurytion mjoebergi is a species of centipede in the Geophilidae family. It is endemic to Australia, and was first described in 1925 by German myriapodologist Karl Wilhelm Verhoeff.

Description
The original description of this species is based on female specimens ranging from 15 mm to 28 mm in length with 37 or 39 pairs of leg.

Distribution
The species occurs in north-eastern Queensland.

Behaviour
The centipedes are solitary terrestrial predators that inhabit plant litter, soil and rotting wood.

References

 

 
mjoebergi
Centipedes of Australia
Endemic fauna of Australia
Fauna of Queensland
Animals described in 1925
Taxa named by Karl Wilhelm Verhoeff